Filtration camp may refer to:

 NKVD filtration camps, camps for the screening of Soviet soldiers in enemy land or under enemy control set by the NKVD
 Filtration camp system in Chechnya, mass internment centers of Chechens applied in Russia during the Chechen Wars
 Russian filtration camps of Ukrainians, used by Russia during the 2022 Russian invasion of Ukraine before forcibly displacing Ukrainian citizens to Russia